Kazhayevo (Qujay) is a rural locality (a village) in Tungatarovsky Selsoviet, Uchalinsky District, Bashkortostan, Russia. The population was 57 as of 2010. There are 2 streets.

Geography 
Kazhayevo is located 60 km northeast of Uchaly (the district's administrative centre) by road. Aznashevo is the nearest rural locality.

References 

Rural localities in Uchalinsky District